Hollywood is a creative writing game released in 1995 by Theatrix Interactive for Windows and Macintosh.

Gameplay
Users input text and can watch the characters read it. The game features a choice of 24 scenes and multiple cartoon animal characters. Having been released for more than a decade and its original developer defunct, this software is now considered abandonware.

Hollywood features ten cartoon characters:
 Larry, a yellow hippie dog.
 Sid, a purple anteater in a blue business suit.
 Tiffany, a glamorous orange dog.
 Artie, a nerdy-looking alligator.
 Charlotte, a policewoman fox.
 Chuck, a palm tree in a flower shirt and lei.
 Billie, A purple dog with glasses and pink hair.
 JJ, a cool dog with a backwards baseball cap.
 Bev, a fat pink cat with blue hair in a green jacket and knee highs.
 Lucille, a pig with curly blonde hair and a red jacket.

Users may change the voices, names, and jobs/interests of the characters.

When Hollywood and Hollywood High were installed on the same computer, the two could be combined by using a key received by calling Theatrix after launching the "Unlock Hollywood" program; however, since the developer is now defunct, this feature is no longer available.

Reception
Entertainment Weekly gave the game an A−.

Hollywood won the 1996 Codie award for Best Home Creativity Software Program.

References

External links
 Official website

Filmmaking video games
1995 video games
Video games developed in the United States
Windows games
Windows-only games
Scholastic Corporation